Chrysler Museum may refer to:
Chrysler Museum of Art in Norfolk, Virginia
Walter P. Chrysler Museum in Auburn Hills, Michigan